is a Japanese voice actress.

Filmography

Television animation

Video games

Dubbing
Deep, Maura

References

External links 
Agency profile 

Voice actresses from Saitama Prefecture
1996 births
Living people
Japanese voice actresses